Counter Insurgency Force or (CIF) A Police tactical unit of West Bengal Police with headquarters in Garia, West Bengal was created by the West Bengal state government in 2010 on the lines of Greyhounds in Andhra Pradesh to combat proscribed Naxalites/Maoists in the state. At least 1000 personnel from the state armed forces have been given commando training prior to inclusion in the CIF. The training center itself is located in Salua, and further field training is given at Salboni, both in West Bengal Midnapore district. Now it shifted to Durgapur.

Trainees are shortlisted from common recruitment procedures. IGP (Armed Police) Vivek Sahay was given additional charge as IGP (Operations) in the force, while Assistant Director of the Sardar Vallabhbhai Patel National Police Academy Ajoy Nanda has taken over as DIG (Training and Operations). Anil Kumar, IPS is a part of the endeavor in the specific capacity of Spl IGP (Operations).

CIF is headed by Ajay Kumar Nand, IPS (IGP, CIF, West Bengal).

CIF was involved in the capture and killing during an firefight of wanted Maoist Mallojula Koteswara Rao, alias Kishenji on 24 November 2011 after a 30-minute gunfight.

See also
 West Bengal Police
 Manoj Verma

References

Non-military counterinsurgency organizations
Law enforcement in West Bengal